WDMS (100.7 FM) is an American radio station licensed to Greenville, Mississippi, United States. The station is currently owned by Monte Spearman and Gentry Todd Spearman, through licensee High Plains Radio Network, LLC. WDMS transmits with 100,000 watts effective radiated power from an antenna 135 meters (442.9 feet) height above average terrain located in Greenville, Mississippi.

Engineer death
In August 2010, Jerold Campbell, a contract engineer for WDMS was fatally electrocuted while working on the station's transmitter.

References

External links

DMS
Country radio stations in the United States
Radio stations established in 1967
Washington County, Mississippi